Theridula emertoni is a species of tangle web spider commonly found in the United States and Canada. Prior to its formal description in 1954, specimens of T. emertoni were often classified as T. opulenta, a species with whom its range overlaps. The species can be reliably distinguished from T. opulenta by the epigyne in females or by the pedipalp in males.

Adult females are between 1.7 and 2.8 mm in length. Adult males are between 1.6 and 2.3 mm in length.

References

External links

Theridula emertoni at Bugguide.net

emertoni
Spiders of North America
Spiders described in 1954